Remez is a surname. Notable people with the name include:

Aharon Remez (1919–1994), Israeli civil servant, politician and diplomat
David Remez (1886–1951), Israeli politician and the country's first Minister of Transportation
Evgeny Yakovlevich Remez (1895–1975), Soviet mathematician
Gideon Remez (born 1946), Israeli journalist 
Jill Remez, American actress
Robert Remez, American experimental psychologist, cognitive scientist, theoretician and teacher

See also 
Remez algorithm
Remez inequality